Samantha Azzopardi (21 August 1988) is an Australian con artist who has been accused of many instances of conning families and authorities not only in her native Australia, but also in Ireland and Canada. In May 2021, Melbourne Magistrates sentenced her to two years imprisonment.

Early life
Samantha Lyndell Azzopardi was born in Campbelltown, New South Wales, Australia in August 1988, of Maltese heritage.

Criminal activities
She first came to the attention of authorities in Rockhampton, Australia in November 2007 when she was 19. She claimed to be Dakota Johnson and she was charged with intent to defraud. In September 2010, she tried to enroll in at least two schools in Brisbane, posing as a student, but was rejected from the second school after her reference letter was found to be fraudulent.

Azzopardi was found outside the General Post Office, Dublin (GPO) in October 2013, wandering up and down and apparently, unable to speak English. She came to be known as the "GPO Girl". Through stilted communications the police believed that she was the victim of sex trafficking and was around 14 years of age. When she was eventually identified, opinion with the Garda Síochána (the Irish Police) was divided; some maintained that she had not committed a crime, as she had not actually claimed anything had been done to her and so needed mental health treatment, others wanted her charged for wasting police time.

In September 2014, aged 26, Azzopardi walked into a health centre in Calgary in Canada claiming her name was Aurora Hepburn and that she was the victim of a sexual assault and abduction. The police spent an estimated CA$150,000 (A$400,000), assembling a case, only to be informed of her identity. Azzopardi was charged with public mischief. In December 2014, the Canadian courts sentenced her to two months detention (which she had already served) and then deported her back to Australia a week later, accompanied by a Canadian Border Services Agency, so that she did not disappear en route.

In late 2016, Azzopardi enrolled at the Good Shepherd School at Marrickville in New South Wales, claiming to be a 13-year old named Harper Hart. In June 2017, she was charged with "dishonestly obtaining financial advantage by deception, for the education, counselling, food, accommodation and electronics she was given while posing as Harper." She pleaded guilty and was sentenced to a year in prison.

In October 2019, she met a French couple who had recently moved to Melbourne. Claiming to be 18 years old and called Sakah, Azzopardi moved into their home to become their au pair under false credentials. In November 2019, she told the parents she was taking the two children on a picnic, but instead took them to a mental health unit in Bendigo, claiming to be a 14-year old who had been abused by her uncle. After this incident, she was charged with child stealing, theft and property deception, which she pleaded guilty to in May 2021, and received a two-year sentence. During the trial, it was revealed following multiple assessments that she had been diagnosed by Australian forensic psychiatrist doctor Jacqueline Rakov as suffering borderline personality disorder and a rare phenomenon called pseudologia fantastica, which manifests itself in compulsive lying, internally motivated by her fantasies to recreate a happy childhood narrative.

References

External links
News article with timeline

1988 births
Living people
21st-century Australian criminals
Australian fraudsters
Impostors
False allegations of sex crimes
People convicted of fraud
People from New South Wales
People with borderline personality disorder